Maharaj Kumar Dr. Basant Narain Singh (b. at Padma Lakshmi Nivas Palace, Hazaribagh District, April 9, 1918) was an Indian politician and a member of the 7th Lok Sabha representing Hazaribagh (Lok Sabha constituency) of Bihar State.

Education and career
Singh was educated at Rajkumar College, Raipur and at Mayo College, Ajmer.

He was also elected as a member of the 3rd, 4th, and 6th Lok Sabha of the Indian Parliament. He was a member of the Bihar State Legislative Assembly during 1952-62 and 1967–74 and Cabinet Minister in Bihar from 1967-72 holding various portfolios such as forest, excise, jail, revenue, public works, and irrigation. He was the general secretary of the Janta Party which was formed by Maharaja of Ramgarh Raj.

Personal life and family
He belonged to the royal family of Ramgarh Raj. He married Kuwarani Vijaya Raje, the daughter of H.R.H. Maharaja Sir Udaji Rao II Parmar (Honorary A.D.C. to King of England) of Dhar State. They had two children, Maharaj Kumar Mayurdhwaja Narain Singh Gaji Sarkar Sahib and Kuwarani Bhawna Raje. Their residence was at Raja Kothi in Hazaribagh.

He was the younger brother of Maharaja Kamakhya Narain Singh Bahadur of Ramgarh Raj, son of the late Raja Lakshmi Narain Singh Bahadur and maternal great-grandson of Maharaja Raja Arjun Singh (freedom fighter) of Porahat Raj (Kolhan Estate).

References

1918 births
1984 deaths
India MPs 1967–1970
India MPs 1962–1967
India MPs 1977–1979
India MPs 1980–1984
People from Hazaribagh district
Lok Sabha members from Bihar
Swatantra Party politicians
People from Ramgarh district